The 1987–88 season was the 50th season of competitive association football in the Football League played by Chester City, an English club based in Chester, Cheshire.

Also, it was the second season spent in the Third Division after the promotion from the Fourth Division in 1986. Alongside competing in the Football League the club also participated in the FA Cup, the Football League Cup and the Associate Members' Cup.

Football League

Results summary

Results by matchday

Matches

FA Cup

League Cup

Associate Members' Cup

Season statistics

References

1987-88
English football clubs 1987–88 season